Enson may refer to:

 Enson (album), by Masaaki Endoh
 Enson Inoue (born 1967), Japanese mixed martial artist
 Faux d'Enson, a mountain in Switzerland
 Enson, a character in The First comic book series

See also
 Enson (disambiguation)